The 2018–19 Irani Cup is the 57th season of Irani Cup, a first-class cricket competition in India. It was played as a one-off match between the Vidarbha (the winner of the 2018–19 Ranji Trophy) and Rest of India cricket team, from 12 February 2019 to 16 February 2019. In April 2018, ESPNcricinfo had reported that Irani Cup was proposed to be no more part of the domestic season but it was included in the final schedule released by BCCI in July. Vidarbha successfully defended their title and defeated Rest of India on first-innings basis to win the tournament. Vidarbha became the third team after Bombay and Karnataka to defend both the Ranji Trophy and Irani Cup. Hanuma Vihari became the first player to score 3 consecutive centuries in Irani Cup.

Squads

Umesh Yadav had a niggle and was replaced by Darshan Nalkande.

Match

References

First-class cricket matches
2019 in Indian cricket
Irani Cup
Irani Cup
Irani Cup